Vitali Romanenko (13 July 1926 – 3 October 2010) was a Ukrainian sport shooter. He was born in Kyiv. Competing for the Soviet Union, he won a gold medal in 100 metre running deer at the 1956 Summer Olympics in Melbourne.

References

External links

1926 births
2010 deaths
Sportspeople from Kyiv
Ukrainian male sport shooters
Soviet male sport shooters
Olympic shooters of the Soviet Union
Olympic gold medalists for the Soviet Union
Shooters at the 1956 Summer Olympics
Medalists at the 1956 Summer Olympics
Recipients of the Order of Bohdan Khmelnytsky, 3rd class
Honoured Masters of Sport of the USSR
Olympic medalists in shooting